The women's team recurve competition at the 2002 Asian Games in Busan, South Korea was held from 6 to 10 October at the Gangseo Archery Field.

Schedule
All times are Korea Standard Time (UTC+09:00)

Results

Qualification

Knockout round

References 

2002 Asian Games Report, Pages 259–260
Qualification Results
Final Results

External links
Official website

Women